The Bank of Mauritius is the central bank of the Republic of Mauritius. It was established in September 1967 as the central bank of Mauritius.  It was modelled on the Bank of England and was, in effect, set up with the assistance of senior officers of the Bank of England.
Amongst its responsibilities is the issuance of the Mauritian currency, the Mauritian rupee.

History
In the 19th Century three separate commercial banks, now all defunct, operated under the Bank of Mauritius name.

The first Bank of Mauritius started operations in 1813 or so, but survived only until 1825.

The second Bank of Mauritius was a British overseas bank with two boards of directors, one in London and the other in Port Louis. It began operations in 1832 and favored the interests of the planter class.  In 1838 traders established Mauritius Commercial Bank to give themselves an alternative source of credit as until its establishment the Bank of Mauritius had a monopoly on the island.  The financial crisis of 1847 in London resulted in the collapse of the sugar market, and severe losses to both of Mauritius's banks.  Bank of Mauritius ceased business in 1848, though the Mauritius Commercial Bank has survived to the present.

Local interests established the third Bank of Mauritius in 1894 to take over the local business of the failed New Oriental Bank Corporation.  In 1911 the bank opened a branch in the Seychelles. However, in 1916 the Mercantile Bank of India (est. 1893) acquired the bank.  HSBC in turn acquired the Mercantile Bank in 1959.  Because of this history, HSBC refers to itself as the oldest foreign bank in Mauritius.  The next foreign bank to arrive, and to survive to the present, was National Bank of South Africa, an ancestor of Absa Bank Mauritius Limited formerly Barclays Bank Mauritius.

In addition to the above three banks, a bank by the name of the Colonial Bank of Mauritius, Bourbon, and Dependencies, operated between 1812 and 1813.

Board of Commissioners of Currency 
Before the establishment of the Bank, the currency issue was managed by a Board of Commissioners of Currency. The duties of the Board were restricted to those of an issuing authority.

The setting up of the Bank of Mauritius marked the beginning of a new phase in the monetary history of Mauritius, with the monetary system moving forward from the stage of 'Sterling Exchange Standard', under which currency was issued in exchange for sterling at a fixed rate of exchange, to that of a 'managed currency' in which the discretionary role of the monetary authority becomes important.

Objectives of the Bank 
The Bank of Mauritius Act 1966 (as amended) lays down the purposes of the Bank which are to 'safeguard the internal and external value of the currency of Mauritius and its internal convertibility' and to 'direct its policy towards achieving monetary conditions conducive to strengthening the economic activity and prosperity of Mauritius.'

The Bank has been set up as the authority which is responsible for the formulation and execution of monetary policy consistent with stable price conditions.  It also has responsibility for safeguarding the stability and strengthening of the financial system of Mauritius.

Governors
Aunauth Beejadhur (July 1967 to December 1972)
Goorpersad Bunwaree (January 1973 to May 1982)
Indurduth Ramphul (June 1982 to March 1996)
Mitrajeet Dhaneswar Maraye (April 1996 to November 1998)
Rameswurlall Basant Roi (November 1998 to December 2006)
Yandraduth Googoolye (January 2007 to February 2007)
Rundheersing Bheenick (February 2007 to February 2010)
Yandraduth Googoolye (February 2010 to May 2010)
Rundheersing Bheenick (May 2010 to December 2014)
Rameswurlall Basant Roi (December 2014 to January 2018)
Yandraduth Googoolye (January 2018 to February 2020)
Harvesh Kumar Seegolam (Since March 2020 to present)

Online Sales of commemorative coins 
On 12 March 2008, the Bank of Mauritius launched the online sales of commemorative coins and Dodo Gold Coins to international buyers.

See also
 Mauritian rupee
 List of banks in Mauritius
 Economy of Mauritius
 List of central banks of Africa
 List of central banks

References

External links
Official website
Details view on the banks of Mauritius, offers & special services

Mauritius
Companies based in Port Louis
Banks of Mauritius
1967 establishments in Mauritius
Banks established in 1967
Financial regulatory authorities of Mauritius